Switch  is a 2023 South Korean comedy drama film written and directed by Ma Dae-yun. Starring Kwon Sang-woo, Oh Jung-se, and Lee Min-jung, the film depicts the story of Park Kang, a top star who enjoys a splendid single life, a top star who is a recognized scandal maker, and faces a moment when his life changes 180 degrees when he meets a taxi driver on Christmas Eve.  

It was released theatrically in South Korea on January 4, 2023.

Cast
 Kwon Sang-woo as Park Kang, a top star
 Oh Jung-se as Jo Yoon, friend of Park Kang and an extreme job manager  
 Lee Min-jung as Soo-hyun, an art instructor
 Park So-yi as Ro-hee, Soo-hyun's child 
 Kim Joon as Ro-ha, Soo-hyun's child
 Cha Hee as Woo Hee, Park Kang and Jo Yoon's junior

Special appearance 
 Kim Ha-young as bride

Production
Switch marks the comeback of Lee Min-jung in films, her last appearance was in  rom-com Wonderful Radio (2012). Principal photography began on January 17, 2021, and was wrapped up on March 29, 2021.

Release
On November 16, 2022, the distribution company Lotte Entertainment released the first multiverse poster and trailer, announcing the title of the film as Switch, which was previously known as  "The Christmas Present" (keuriseumaseu seonmul). On December 5, 2022 it was announced that the film will premiere on January 4, 2023.

On January 3, 2022 a special money-back guarantee screening of the film was held. A full refund of the admission fee was offered to the audience in case they were dissatisfied with the film and presented the ticket at the box office within 20 minutes after the screening of the film.

Reception

The film released on January 4, 2023, on 866 screens. It opened at 5th place with 30,513 admissions at the Korean box office. 

, with gross of US$3,231,827 and 418,604 admissions, it is the third highest-grossing Korean film of 2023.

Critical response
Choi Jeong-ah reviewing for Sports World praised the performance of Kwon Sang-woo writing, "Kwon Sang-woo's calm and restrained acting in the second half of the play stimulates the audience's tear glands". Choi concluding, opined, "It is an above-average work in all aspects of acting and directing, fun and emotion, message and sound." Kim Yu-jin reviewing for Xports News praised the performance of the cast. Kim appreciating acting of Park So-yi and Kim Joon wrote, "Child actors Park So-yi and Kim Joon's performance are a vital force that disarms the entire generation." Kim quoted director Ma Dae-yun's contention that "it's a movie that's good to watch with your family and is like a gift."

References

External links
 
 
 

2023 films
2023 comedy films
2020s South Korean films
2020s Korean-language films
Lotte Entertainment films
South Korean comedy films
South Korean drama films